New Trial is a 2017 South Korean film written and directed by Kim Tae-yoon, starring Jung Woo and Kang Ha-neul. The film is based on the 2000 "Iksan murder case" where a teenage boy was falsely accused of the murder of a taxi driver and spends ten years in prison.

Plot
The film tells the story of a man whose life was stolen when he was accused of the murder of a taxi driver which he did not commit, and had to confess to the crime as he was abused during police interrogation. 10 years later he seeks help from a lawyer who had financial debts to clear his name.

Cast

 Jung Woo as Lee Joon-young  
 Kang Ha-neul as Jo Hyun-woo
 Kim Hae-sook as Soon-im 
 Lee Dong-hwi as Mo Chang-hwan
 Lee Geung-young as Attorney Goo Pil-ho
 Han Jae-young as Baek Chul-gi
 Kim So-jin as Kang Hyo-jin
 Min Jin-woong as Oh Jong-hak
 Lee Jung-eun as Oh Mi-ri
 Kim Young-jae as Choi Young-jae
 Sung Do-hyun as Detective Cha
 Yang Hee-myung as Detective Dong
 Park Do-shik as Tae-goo
 Jin Ye-ju as Soo-jung
 Park Chul-min as Team leader Hwang
 Kim Ha-na as Byul-yi
 Choi Jung-hun as Oh Jong-hak's friend
 Ha Sung-kwang as Witness
 Lee Dong-hee as Taxi driver 
 Park Hee-jung (actress) as Myung-hee

Awards and nominations

References

External links

New Trial at Naver Movies 

South Korean crime drama films
2017 films
2010s crime drama films
2017 drama films
South Korean films based on actual events
2010s South Korean films
2010s Korean-language films